Gradin or Gradín is the surname of the following people
Anita Gradin (born 1933), Swedish politician 
Carles Poch-Gradin (born 1982), Spanish tennis player
Isabelino Gradín (1897–1944), Uruguayan football player and athlete
Luis Gradín, Argentine rugby union player and coach
Peter Gradin (born 1958), Swedish ice hockey player 
Thomas Gradin (born 1956), Swedish ice hockey scout and former player